James Henderson Kyle (29 May 1879 – 11 January 1919) was an Australian cricketer. He played 17 first-class cricket matches for Victoria between 1908 and 1912.

Family
The son of Alexander Kyle, and Mary Kyle, née Cooper, James Henderson Kyle was born at Coimadai on 29 May 1879. He married Mary Henderson Armstrong (1874-1952) on 15 March 1905.

Death
He collapsed and died, having completed his innings and chatting with friends spectators, during a cricket match at Middle Park on 11 January 1919.

See also
 List of Victoria first-class cricketers

Footnotes

External links
 

1879 births
1919 deaths
Australian cricketers
Victoria cricketers